The Elizabeth Public Library is the free public library of Elizabeth, New Jersey. Serving a population  of approximately 127,558, its collection contains 342,305 volumes, circulating 190,581 items annually from its four locations.

Locations
Main Library - 11 South Broad Street
LaCorte Branch Library - 408 Palmer Street
Elmora Branch Library - 730 W. Grand Street
Elizabethport Branch Library - 102-110 Third Street

Carnegie library building

Elizabeth's Main Library was built during the "free library movement" at the turn of the 20th century in part with the impetus of Charles N. Fowler, US Congressman from Union County. It is one of  New Jersey's original thirty-six Carnegie libraries, which by the 1940s had become one of the busiest libraries of its size in the USA. Records show that millionaire Andrew Carnegie granted $130,810 made February 3, 1910, for the main and no longer existing Liberty Plaza branch libraries. Opened in 1912, the building, reminiscent of an Italian palazzo and the Boston Public Library was designed by Edward Lippincott Tilton, who had designed many other Carnegie libraries as well as the immigration station at Ellis Island. It is a contributing property to the Midtown Historic District, a state and federal historic district established in 1994–1995. The Main Library is the Federal Depository Library for Union County.

See also
List of Carnegie libraries in New Jersey
National Register of Historic Places listings in Union County, New Jersey

References

External links 

Library Thing

Library buildings completed in 1912
Education in Elizabeth, New Jersey
Carnegie libraries in New Jersey
Tourist attractions in Union County, New Jersey
Beaux-Arts architecture in New Jersey
Buildings and structures in Elizabeth, New Jersey
1912 establishments in New Jersey
New Jersey Register of Historic Places
Historic district contributing properties in New Jersey